Probucol, sold under the trade name Lorelco among others, is an anti-hyperlipidemic drug initially developed for the treatment of coronary artery disease. Clinical development was discontinued after it was found that the drug may have the undesired effect of lowering HDL in patients with a previous history of heart disease. It may also cause QT interval prolongation.

Probucol was initially developed in the 1970s by a chemical company to maximize airplane tire longevity.

Mechanism of action 
Probucol lowers the level of cholesterol in the bloodstream by increasing the rate of LDL catabolism. Additionally, probucol may inhibit cholesterol synthesis and delay cholesterol absorption. Probucol is a powerful antioxidant which inhibits the oxidation of cholesterol in LDLs; this slows the formation of foam cells, which form atherosclerotic plaques. After promising test results in mouse models, Probucol is under study at Weston Brain Institute of McGill University as a possible aid in delaying the onset of Alzheimer's disease.

Probucol has also been shown to inhibit ABCA1-dependent cholesterol transport, which may contribute to its known effect of lowering HDL.

References

Antioxidants
Phenols
Thioethers
Tert-butyl compounds